ACS Jakarta is a Methodist school in Jakarta, Indonesia. In 2006 it joined the Anglo-Chinese Schools (ACS) family. It was started in 1996 as Sekolah Tiara Bangsa (STB) and entered into a partnership with ACS in 2002. The name was changed officially to ACS Jakarta in 2015.

Programmes
The school admits boys and girls from nursery to grade 12 (3 – 18 years old). Students sit for the Cambridge Primary Checkpoint Test at the end of Grade 6, the Cambridge International General Certificate of Secondary Education at the end of grade 10, and the International Baccalaureate at the end of grade 12.

References

External links

 School website

Anglo-Chinese School
Methodist schools
International Baccalaureate schools in Indonesia
Schools in Jakarta
Christian schools in Indonesia
International schools in Greater Jakarta
International schools in Indonesia